Michael John Pinner (born 16 February 1934) is an English former amateur footballer who played as a goalkeeper.

Club career
Born in Boston, Pinner spent his early career with Boston Grammar School, Wyberton Rangers, Notts County, Cambridge University, Hendon, Pegasus, Aston Villa and Arsenal. He later played for Sheffield Wednesday, Corinthian-Casuals, Queens Park Rangers, Manchester United, Chelsea, Hendon, Swansea City, Leyton Orient and Lisburn Distillery.

International career
Pinner played for the England amateur national team, earning 52 caps.

He also participated for Great Britain at the Olympics in 1956 and 1960, making three appearances in total.

Later career
He combined his amateur playing career with his day job as a lawyer, and he later became a property developer, living in London after retiring.

References

1934 births
Living people
English footballers
Notts County F.C. players
Cambridge University A.F.C. players
Hendon F.C. players
Pegasus A.F.C. players
Aston Villa F.C. players
Arsenal F.C. players
Sheffield Wednesday F.C. players
Corinthian-Casuals F.C. players
Queens Park Rangers F.C. players
Manchester United F.C. players
Chelsea F.C. players
Swansea City A.F.C. players
Leyton Orient F.C. players
Lisburn Distillery F.C. players
English Football League players
NIFL Premiership players
Association football goalkeepers
England amateur international footballers
Footballers at the 1956 Summer Olympics
Footballers at the 1960 Summer Olympics
Olympic footballers of Great Britain
People educated at Boston Grammar School
People from Boston, Lincolnshire